Pseudoalteromonas atlantica is a marine bacterium, which has been shown to act as a primary producer of biofilms and exhibit virulence against Cancer pagurus, a species of crab, through secretion of extracellular products.

References

External links

Type strain of Pseudoalteromonas atlantica at BacDive -  the Bacterial Diversity Metadatabase

Alteromonadales
Bacteria described in 1995